Raoul Aragon was a former Filipino actor in drama and action movies in the Philippines. Aragon was nominated in Gawad Urian Award 1980 as Best Actor in the movie Ina ka ng Anak Mo and he won the Best Actor award in Metro Manila Film Festival 1979 in the same movie (Ina Ka ng Anak Mo). He was also known as Raul Aragon, Raoul Aragonn.

Career
Aragon was the leading man of Nora Aunor in the movie Ina Ka Ng Anak Mo with Lolita Rodriguez, directed by Lino Brocka, which he played the husband of Nora Aunor.

Filmography
1969 Adriana ---starring Amalia Fuentes, Luis Gonzales, Dante Rivero
1970 Young Love ---starring Nora Aunor, Tirso Cruz III, Vilma Santos, Edgar Mortiz
1970 Dream Of Jeanne ---starring Manny de Leon, Mila del Sol
1970 From Both Sides Now ---starring Rosemarie Sonora, Tirso Cruz III
1970 For Once In My Life ---starring Esperanza Fabon, Baby Alcaraz
1970 Your Love ---starring Eddie Peregrina
1972 Till Death Do Us Part ---starring Hilda Koronel
1972 Sixteen ---starring Vilma Santos, Edgar Mortiz
1973 Ikaw Lamang ---starring Vilma Santos
1973 Tanikalang Dugo ---starring Dante Rivero, Boots Anson-Roa
1974 Huli Huli Yan! ---starring Dolphy
1975 Meron Akong Nakita ---starring Dolphy, Gina Pareño, Lotis Key
1976 Bertong Suklab ---starring Ramon Revilla, Anna Gonzales
1976 Beloy Montemayor ---starring Ramon Revilla
1976 Babaing Hiwalay Sa Asawa ---starring Amalia Fuentes, Vic Vargas
1977 Walang Bakas Na Naiiwan ---starring Dante Rivero, Celia Rodriguez, Dante Varona
1977 Mapupulang Labi ---starring Carmen Ronda, Johnny Delgado
1977 Pag-ibig Ko'y Awitin Mo ---starring Nora Aunor, Armida Siguion-Reyna
1977 Ang Huling Babae Sa Daigdig ---starring Leila Hermosa
1977 Lalaki, Babae Kami ---starring Pinky de Leon, Alona Alegre, Eddie Garcia
1977 Task Force Kingfisher ---starring Ramon Revilla, Rosanna Ortiz
1978 Basta Kabit, May Sabit ---starring Trixia Gomez, Vivian Velez, Eddie Gutierrez, Orestes Ojeda
1978 Boy Pena ---starring Bembol Roco, Chanda Romero, Michael de Mesa
1978 Salonga ---starring Rudy Fernandez
1979 Hold Up (Special Squad, D.B.) ---starring Vic Vargas, Rudy Fernandez
1979 Ina, Kapatid, Anak ---starring Lolita Rodriguez, Charito Solis, Ric Rodrigo, Rio Locsin
1979 Ina ka ng Anak Mo ---starring Nora Aunor, Lolita Rodriguez
1980 Ex-Wife
1980 Palawan
1980 Ang Kabiyak
1980 Alaga
1980 Tres Kantos
1980 Angela Markado
1980 Waikiki
1981 Kamakalawa
1981 The Betamax Story
1981 Kontrobersyal
1982 Karibal Ko ang Aking Ina
1982 Task Force King Fisher Beloy Montemayor
1982 Guillermo Soliman
1982 Krus sa Bawat Punglo
1982 Santa Claus Is Coming to Town!
1983 Indecent Exposure
1983 Inside Job
1983 Kirot
1983 Strangers in Paradise
1983 To Mama with Love
1983 Babaeng Selyado
1983 Hubad Na Gubat
1983 Public Enemy No. 1 and the Innocents
1983 Laruan1983 Teng Teng De Sarapen1983 Over My Dead Body1983 Bago Kumalat ang Kamandag1984 Sigaw ng Katarungan1984 Ahas sa Paraiso1984 Bangkang Papel Sa Dagat ng Apoy
1984 Nalalasap ang Hapdi
1984 Daang Hari
1984 Dumalaga
1984 Experience
1984 Sariwa
1985 Ben Tumbling
1985 Matamis ang Nakaw Na Tubig
1985 Cop Brutus Logan, The Crime Buster
1985 Baun Gang
1985 Mga Alipin Ng Laman
1985 Lihim sa Likod ng Buwan
1985 Nene
1985 Ulo ng Gang-Ho
1985 Mga Manikang Hubad
1985 Alyas Junior Buang, Mad Killer ng Visayas
1985 Anak ng Tondo
1985 Uhaw Na Uhaw
1985 Eden
1985 Bayan Ko: Kapit sa Patalim
1985 Boboy Tibayan, Tigre ng Cavite
1986 Panganib Bawat Sandali ng Ligaya
1986 Hapdi
1986 Sloane
1986 Revenge of the Street Warrior
1986 Gisingin Natin ang Gabi
1986 Huwag Pamarisan: Kulasisi
1986 Huwag Mo Kaming Isumpa
1986 Hiram Na Katawan
1986 Kapirasong Dangal
1986 Bukas... Wala ng Bala
1986 Walang Ititirang Buhay
1987 Operation: Get Victor Corpuz, the Rebel Soldier
1987 Kapitan Pablo
1987 Humanda Ka... Ikaw ang Susunod
1987 Cabarlo
1987 Pasan Ko ang Daigdig
1987 Olongapo... The Great American Dream
1988 Naglalarong Puso
1988 Boy Negro
1988 Ambush
1988 White Force
1988 Patrolman
1988 Agila ng Maynila
1989 Sgt. Niñonuevo: The Fastest Gun Alive of WPD - as Kumander Pamintuan
1989 Arrest: Pat. Rizal Alih – Zamboanga Massacre - as Colonel Romeo Abendan
1989 Florencio Dino Public Enemy No. 1 of Caloocan
1989 Get Commander Jack Moro: Bangsa Moro Army 
1989 Moises Platon
1989 Hindi Pahuhuli ng Buhay - as Dolpo
1989 Delima Gang
1989 Ang Babaeng Nawawala sa Sarili
1990 Irampa si Mediavillo
1990 Target... Police General: Major General Alfredo Lim Story
1990 Double M
1990 Hulihin Si... Boy Amores
1990 Kahit Singko Ay Di Ko Babayaran ang Buhay Mo - as Jimmy
1990 Bala at Rosaryo
1990 APO: Kingpin ng Maynila
1991 Kapitan Jaylo: Batas sa Batas
1991 Ganti ng Api
1991 McBain
1995 Sana Maulit Muli

Awards

References

External links

Filipino male film actors
Living people
Year of birth missing (living people)